Coweta can refer to:

Coweta (tribal town), one of four mother towns of the Muscogee Creek Confederacy

 Coweta, Oklahoma, United States
Coweta Public Schools
Coweta High School
 Coweta County, Georgia, United States

See also
Koweta Mission Site